Christopher Barry Collins is a cosmologist who has written many papers with Stephen Hawking. He is a professor emeritus of applied mathematics at the University of Waterloo.

Collins earned his Ph.D. in 1972 from the University of Cambridge under the supervision of F. Gerard Friedlander.
Among his works with Hawking is a 1973 paper that uses the anthropic principle to provide a solution to the flatness problem.

Selected publications
.
.
.
.
.

See also
 List of University of Waterloo people

References 

Living people
Canadian cosmologists
20th-century British mathematicians
20th-century Canadian mathematicians
Year of birth missing (living people)
Place of birth missing (living people)
Alumni of the University of Cambridge
Academic staff of the University of Waterloo